Brian Broome (born 1969 or 1970) is an American memoirist, poet, and screenwriter from Ohio. He is best known for his award-winning memoir Punch Me Up to the Gods.

Education and career 
Broome received his Master of Fine Arts degree from the University of Pittsburgh, where he also worked as a K. Leroy Irvis Fellow and an instructor in the Writing Program. His first full-length book, Punch Me Up to the Gods, was purchased by Houghton Mifflin Harcourt while he was still a student.

Broome currently writes for The Washington Post and is a Writer in Residence at St. Mary’s College in Moraga, California.

Awards 
In 2021, Broome was named Pittsburgh's Person of the Year in the Literature category.

References

External links 
 Official website

University of Pittsburgh alumni
American LGBT writers
Writers from Ohio
Lambda Literary Award winners
Kirkus Prize winners
LGBT memoirists
1970s births
Living people